Malando Gassama (born Malang Omar Gassam; 7 February 1946 – 25 January 1999) was a Gambian percussionist who spent most of his music career in Sweden. He recorded and performed with many notable Swedish and international artists such as ABBA, Al Jarreau, Anni-Frid Lyngstad (of ABBA), Ted Gärdestad, Bette Midler, Gábor Szabó, Janne Schaffer, David Sanborn, Viktoria Tolstoy, Jaco Pastorius, and Blacknuss Allstars, etc. He was one of the backup musicians on ABBA - the Movie and was featured on documentaries which aired on Swedish television and radio. His last concert appearance was with Bob Manning's Soul Enterprise at Fasching Jazz Club in Stockholm. He died 2 weeks later in Gambia.

Recordings
1960s
Viva Super Eagles, The Super Eagles, 1969
1970s
Baltik, Baltik, 1973
Waterloo, ABBA, 1974
Cozy Square, RESA (Swedish jazz band; formed 1972), 1974
Frida ensam ("Frida Alone"), Anni-Frid Lyngstad, 1975
Don't Give a Damn, Monica Törnell, 1975
Franska Kort, Ted Gärdestad, 1976
Arrival, ABBA, 1976
Upptåg Ted Gärdestad, 1976 
The Album, ABBA, 1977
Pugh Rogefeldt, Bamalama, 1977
Blue Virgin Isles, Ted Gärdestad, 1978
Voulez-Vous, ABBA, 1979
Greatest Hits Vol. 2 (compilation album), ABBA, 1979
1980s
 As We Speak, David Sanborn, 1981
 The Singles: The First Ten Years, ABBA, 1982
 No Frills, Bette Midler, 1983
 In London (live at the Wembley), Al Jarreau, 1984
 ABBA Live, ABBA, 1986
 Monica Z, Monica Zetterlund, 1989
1990s–2000
 Montreux Jazz Festival 25th Anniversary, Various Artists 1991
 Experience The Divine Bette Midler, 1993
 En Salig man, Svante Thuresson, 1993
 Thank You For The Music,  ABBA, 1994
 Home to Me, Eric Bibb, 2000

Various years

* The Very Best of ABBA, ABBA
 ABBA Box, ABBA
 Originals, ABBA
 Ablution, Ablution

 Me to You, Eric Bibb
 Gold: A Decade Of Soul, Jazz & R&B, Blacknuss
 Efter Midnatt, Tommy Broman
 Carte Postale, Francis Cabrel
 African Suite, Berndt Egerbladh
 Jungle Wave, Eleanor

 Irish Coffee / No Violence, Mats Glenngård
 Violin Race, Mats Glenngård
 Smile, Harpo
 Eskimo Heat, Häxmjölk
 Balsam, Merit Hemmingson
 Family, Joe Higgs
 Veckans Affärer, John Holm
 Söndag I Sängen, Bo Kaspers Orkester
 Ut På Stan, Tomas Ledin

 Cous Cous, 
 Boogie Woogie,  Björn Jayson Lindh
 Raggie,  Björn Jayson Lindh
 Bike Voyage II,  Björn Jayson Lindh
 Second Carneval,  Björn Jayson Lindh
 Jayson Lindh,  Björn Jayson Lindh
 Day At The Surface, Björn Jayson Lindh (Björn J:son Lindh)

 Påtalåtar, Ola Magnell
 No Frills, Bette Midler
 Divine Collection, Bette Midler
 Indestructible, Lisa Nilsson
 Till Morelia, Lisa Nilsson
 Genomskådad, Ingemar Olsson

 Janne Schaffer, Janne Schaffer
 Andra LP, Janne Schaffer 
 The Chinese, Janne Schaffer 
 Second Album, Janne Schaffer 
 Katharsis, Janne Schaffer 
 Earmeal, Janne Schaffer 
 Traffic, Janne Schaffer 
 Överblick, Janne Schaffer 

 Finn, Finn Sjöberg 
 Skifs Hits, Björn Skifs 
 Vår Om Du Vill, Björn Skifs 
 Belsta River, Gabor Szabo 
 In Stockholm, Gabor Szabo 

 Bits & Pieces, Eje Thelin 
 För Älskad, Viktoria Tolstoy 
 Don't Give A Damn, Monica Törnell 
 A La Carte, Triumvirat 
 Rainbow, Al Vizzutti 
 Wellander & Ronander, Wellander & Ronander

References

http://home.cogeco.ca/~mansion1/malandogassama.html
http://www.paulkorda.com/biography.htm
Åke Sundqvist
Zak Keigh - Gigs
http://music.barnesandnoble.com/Artist/Malando-Gassama/c/127713

Gambian musicians
Percussionists
1998 deaths
1946 births
Gambian emigrants to Sweden
Swedish percussionists
Gambian expatriates in Sweden